Steve Paul Myer (born July 17, 1954) is a former professional American football player who played in 4 NFL seasons from 1976-1979 for the Seattle Seahawks.

See also
 List of NCAA major college football yearly passing leaders

Notes

1954 births
American football quarterbacks
Living people
New Mexico Lobos football players
People from Covina, California
Seattle Seahawks players
Sportspeople from Los Angeles County, California
Players of American football from California